Henry or Henri de Sully may refer to:

Henry de Sully (died 1189), abbot of Fécamp, bishop-designate of Salisbury and archbishop-elect of York
Henry de Sully (bishop of Worcester), abbot of Glastonbury and bishop of Worcester
Henry de Sully, Archbishop of Bourges (died 1200)
Henri IV de Sully (died 1336), treasurer of Philip V of France and seneschal of Gascony